Jan Janusz Benigier (born 18 February 1950) is a Polish footballer who played as a forward. 

He competed in the men's tournament at the 1976 Summer Olympics in Montreal. He won 3 national titles (1974, 1975 and 1979) and 1 national cup (1974) with Ruch Chorzów.

References

External links
 

1950 births
Living people
People from Radom
Sportspeople from Masovian Voivodeship
Association football forwards
Polish footballers
Polish expatriate footballers
Poland international footballers
Olympic footballers of Poland
Footballers at the 1976 Summer Olympics
Olympic silver medalists for Poland
Olympic medalists in football
Medalists at the 1976 Summer Olympics
Ruch Chorzów players
R.F.C. Seraing (1904) players
Expatriate footballers in Belgium
Polish expatriate sportspeople in Belgium